Erik Nels Rasmussen (born January 27, 1957) is an American meteorologist and leading expert on mesoscale meteorology, severe convective storms, forecasting of storms, and tornadogenesis. He was the field coordinator of the first of the VORTEX projects in 1994-1995 and a lead principal investigator for VORTEX2 from 2009-2010 and VORTEX-SE from 2016-2017, as well as involved in other smaller VORTEX offshoots and many field projects.

Biography

Education 
Rasmussen was born in Hutchinson, Kansas to James and Ilse Rasmussen in 1957. His younger brother Neal, a software engineer, is also a storm chaser and is an accomplished videographer and photographer. 

Rasmussen's undergraduate meteorology study was at the University of Oklahoma (OU) in Norman where he received a B.Sc. in 1980. Here he was introduced to field research under Howard Bluestein, chasing supercells and tornadoes, and learning about thunderstorm structure and processes. He went on to graduate school at Texas Tech University (TTU) in Lubbock where he earned a M.Sc. in atmospheric sciences in 1982. In grad school he developed a reputation as a particularly adept forecaster and interceptor of severe storms and tornadoes and was nicknamed "The Dryline Kid" in reference to the dry line which initiates isolated storms and attendant tornadoes. His thesis was The Tulia Outbreak Storm: Mesoscale Evolution and Photogrammetric Analysis.

From 1982-1984, Rasmussen pursued further postgraduate work at the University of Illinois at Urbana-Champaign (UIUC). He worked at W.A.R.N. Inc., Now Weather Inc., WeatherData Inc., and PROFS (which became the Forecast Systems Laboratory or FSL before that unit was merged into the Earth System Research Laboratory or ESRL). He finished his Ph.D. at Colorado State University (CSU) in Ft. Collins in 1992. At CSU he participated in more field work, including researching squall lines in Australia and his dissertation was titled Observational and Theoretical Study of Squall Line Evolution.

Career 
Rasmussen became a research meteorologist at the National Severe Storms Laboratory (NSSL) and then the Cooperative Institute for Mesoscale Meteorological Studies (CIMMS). After the study of squall lines his interest returned to supercells from the microphysical aspects of cloud particles to mesoscale environments modulating storm behavior. He was the field commander (FC) of Project VORTEX in 1994-1995 where he worked with lead forecaster Charles A. Doswell III, participated in SUB-VORTEX and VORTEX-99, STEPS, IHOP, and served on the steering committee and was a lead principal investigator (PI) for VORTEX2 in 2009-2010 as well as project manager for VORTEX-SE in 2016-2017.

Since his college days Rasmussen was a major contributor to Storm Track magazine although by the mid-1990s his previously intense interest in storm chasing was waning. For years he did research and computer programming through his company Rasmussen Systems located near Grand Junction, Colorado. This work remains supported by the National Science Foundation (NSF) and he consults for NSSL and CIMMS, private meteorological companies, and other entities. In 2015 Rasmussen moved back to Norman, where he continues this aforementioned work and serves as Program Manager for the VORTEX-SE project.

See also 
 Robert Davies-Jones
 David Dowell
 Katharine Kanak
 Paul Markowski
 Jerry Straka
 Joshua Wurman

References

External links 
 Rasmussen Systems
 NSSL awards
 
 

American meteorologists
Storm chasers
University of Oklahoma alumni
Texas Tech University alumni
University of Illinois Urbana-Champaign alumni
Colorado State University alumni
University of Oklahoma faculty
Living people
1957 births
National Weather Service people